Marjorie Best (10 April 1903 – 14 June 1997) was an American Hollywood costume designer known for her period designs.

Best was born in Jacksonville, Illinois and studied at the Chouinard Art Institute.  She taught school briefly before going to work for the Western Costume Company in 1926. She later moved to United Costumers. When that company was purchased by Warner Bros. in 1936, she was given a position in the studio's wardrobe department.

Her first film as a costume designer was Silver River (1948). She earned an Oscar for costume design in 1949 for her collaboration on the Errol Flynn film Adventures of Don Juan. She was nominated in 1956 for Giant, in 1960 for Sunrise at Campobello, and in 1965 for The Greatest Story Ever Told, the same year she retired.

Best died on June 14, 1997 in Toluca Lake, California of a heart ailment.

External links

Allmovie bio
Marjorie Best papers, Margaret Herrick Library, Academy of Motion Picture Arts and Sciences

1903 births
1997 deaths
Best Costume Design Academy Award winners
American costume designers
Women costume designers
Chouinard Art Institute alumni
People from Jacksonville, Illinois